Al Hilal Juba Football Club is a South Sudanese football club located in Juba, South Sudan, which currently plays in the South Sudan Football Championship.

Name and history
The name Hilāl is the Arabic word for crescent – a name chosen on a night when the crescent of the moon was visible in Omdurman. Also it is the first club in the world to be named (AL- HILAL).
This name coming from North Sudan.

Al Hilal Juba was established in 1956 by the Sudanese community in Juba, who were fans of Al Hilal Omdurman. Since then, they have gone onto become one of Juba's strongest clubs and are the reigning South Sudan Cup champions after taking the title in 2017.

Stadium
Currently the team plays at the 12000 capacity Juba Stadium.

Honours

South Sudan competitions
South Sudan Football Championship: 2
Winners:  2012, 2014
 Runners-up (2): 2015, 2017
South Sudan National Cup:3
Winners: 2013, 2014, 2015

Performance in CAF competitions 

CAF Confederation Cup: 1 appearance
2014 – Preliminary round

2018 – Preliminary round

CAF Champions League: 1 appearances

2012 – Preliminary round

References

External links
South Sudan Championship Tournament 2013, rsssf.com

Football clubs in South Sudan